Davidson is a patronymic surname, meaning "son/descendant of David" (or "Beloved Son/Descendant"; 'David' lit. "Beloved One"). There are alternate spellings called septs, including those common in the British Isles and Scandinavia: Davidsen, Davisson, Davison, Daveson, Davidsson. While the given name comes from the Hebrew "David", meaning beloved, Davidson is rarely used as a masculine given name or nickname.

It is also an anglicised version of the Ashkenazi Jewish surname Davidovitch, Slavic for "son of David" and Davidoff.

Surname
Notable people with the surname Davidson include:

A–D
Adam Davidson (disambiguation)
Alan Davidson (disambiguation)
Alan Keith Davidson (1929–2021), Australian cricketer
Alan Davidson (food writer) (1924–2003), British diplomat, historian and food writer
Alan Davidson (Scottish footballer) (born 1960), Scottish footballer
Alan Douglas Davidson, Australian pilot; first Qantas death
Alan Edward Davidson (born 1960), Australian soccer player
Alexander Davidson (disambiguation), several people, including:
Alexander Davidson (architect) (1839–1908), Scottish architect
Alex Davidson (Australian footballer), Australian rules footballer
Alex Davidson (rugby league), rugby league player
Allan Davidson (disambiguation)
Scotty Davidson Allan "Scotty" Davidson (1890–1915), Canadian hockey player
Amy Davidson (born 1979), American actress
Andrew B. Davidson (1831–1902), Scottish Hebrew scholar
Andy Davidson (disambiguation)
Anstruther Davidson (1860–1932), Scottish-American physician and botanist
Anthony Davidson (born 1979), British racing driver
Arnold Davidson, American philosopher
Arthur Davidson (disambiguation)
Austin Quinn-Davidson (born 1979), American politician
Avram Davidson (1923–1993), American science fiction writer
Basil Davidson (1914–2010), English historian of Africa
Ben Davidson (1940–2012), American football player
Bessie Davidson (1879–1965), Australian painter
Bill Davidson (disambiguation), several people, including:
Bill Davidson (American football, born 1915) (1915–1970), American football player
Bill Davidson (American football, born 1935) (1935–1999), American football player and coach
Bill Davidson (baseball) (1884–1954), outfielder in Major League Baseball (1909–1911)
Bill Davidson (businessman) (1923–2009), American business and professional sports executive
Bill Davidson (rugby league) (fl. 1914–1923), New Zealand rugby league player
 Bill Davidson, (1948–2004), Canadian rock climber, known as Kayak Bill
Bob Davidson (ice hockey), Canadian hockey player
Bob Davidson (umpire), baseball umpire
Brandon Davidson, (born 1991), Canadian ice hockey player
Bruce Davidson (equestrian), American equestrian
Bruce Davidson (photographer) (born 1933), American photographer
Callum Davidson, Scottish football player and coach
Carolyn Davidson, designed the Nike swoosh
Charles Davidson (disambiguation), multiple people
Charlie Davidson (born 1972), American football player
Chris Davidson (disambiguation), multiple people
Chy Davidson (born 1959), American football player
Cotton Davidson (1931-2022), American football player
David Davidson (disambiguation), several people
Davidson (Essex cricketer), English cricketer playing 1784–1787
Dean Davidson (born 1985), Speedway race car driver
Della Davidson (1951–2012), American modern dancer and choreographer
D. J. Davidson (born 1997), American football player
Donald Davidson (disambiguation), several people, including:
Donald Davidson (historian), British-born Indianapolis Motor Speedway historian
Donald Davidson (philosopher) (1917–2003), American philosopher
Donald Davidson (poet) (1893–1968), American poet
Doug Davidson (born 1954), American actor

E–L
Eileen Davidson (born 1959), American actress
Ellis A. Davidson (1828–1878), British art writer and lecturer
Eric H. Davidson (1937–2015), American biologist
Ernest R. Davidson (born 1936), American chemist
Frances Davidson, Viscountess Davidson (1894–1985), British politician
Frankie Davidson (born 1934), Australian singer and entertainer
George Davidson (disambiguation), multiple people
Greg Davidson (born 1970), Australian cricketer
Greg Davidson (American football) (born 1958), American football player
Gustav Davidson (1895–1971), American poet and angelologist
Harold Davidson (1875–1937), English clergyman who was defrocked
Harriet Miller Davidson (1839–1883), Scottish-Australian novelist
 Brigadier General Henry Brevard Davidson (1831–1899), American Civil War, Confederate Army
Hilda Ellis Davidson (1914–2006), English antiquarian and mythographer
Hugh Davidson (disambiguation)
Ian Davidson (British politician) (born 1950), Scottish politician
Inger Davidson (born 1944), Swedish politician
J. Norman Davidson (FRS), Scottish biochemist, pioneer molecular biologist and textbook author.
Jack Davidson (1875–1952), Australian rules footballer
Jack Davidson (Scottish footballer) (born 1925), Scottish footballer (East Fife FC)
James Dale Davidson, American founder of the National Taxpayers Union
James Davidson (disambiguation)
James Duncan Davidson (born 1970), software engineer
James Edward Davidson Australian founder of News Limited
Jane Davidson (born 1957), Welsh politician
Jaye Davidson (born 1968), British actor
Jim Davidson (disambiguation), several people, including:
Jim Davidson (born 1953), English comedian
Jo Davidson, American sculptor
John Andrew Davidson (1852–1903), Canadian politician
John Davidson (disambiguation), several people, including:
John Davidson (entertainer) (born 1941), American actor, host of the game show Hollywood Squares
John Davidson (ice hockey) (1912–1996), a retired Canadian professional ice hockey player
John Davidson (poet) (1857–1909), Scottish poet and playwright
John Davidson, 1st Viscount Davidson, earlier known as John Colin Campbell Davidson,(1889–1970), British politician
John Ogilvie Davidson, Canadian packer, guide and rancher, known as "Skook" Davidson 
 Major General John Davidson (general) John "Black Jack" Davidson (1825–1881), Mexican–American War
Jonathan Davidson, British civil engineer and soldier
Kevin Davidson (born 1997), American football player
Lauren Davidson (born 2001), Scottish footballer
Leslie Davidson (1850–1915), Scottish cricketer and soldier
Lionel Davidson (1922–2009), English poet
Logan Davidson (born 1997), American baseball player

M–R
Majel Davidson (1885–1969), Scottish artist
Margaret Davidson (suffragist) (1879–1978), Scottish suffragist, teacher and WW1 nurse
Dame Margaret Davidson (1871–1964), British wife of colonial governor of New South Wales, Australia
Margaret A. Davidson (1950–2017),American lawyer and coastal science pioneer
Marlon Davidson (born 1998), American football player
Marie Davidson (born 1987), French-Canadian electronic musician
Mary Davidson (disambiguation)
Matthew Davidson (disambiguation)
Max Davidson (1875–1950), German-born film comedian
Melody Davidson, Canadian hockey coach
Michael Davidson (poet) (born 1944), American poet
Michael Davidson (singer) (born 1969), singer and songwriter
Mike Davidson (born 1963), New Zealand freestyle swimmer
Murray Davidson, Scottish football player
Neil Davidson, Baron Davidson of Glen Clova, Scottish lawyer
Nora Fontaine Davidson (1836–1929), American teacher
Ogunlade Davidson, Sierra Leonean academic
Osha Gray Davidson (born 1954), American writer
Owen Davidson (born 1943), Australian tennis player
Patricia Davidson (Canadian politician) (born 1946), Canadian politician
Paul Davidson (disambiguation)
Pete Davidson (born 1993), American stand-up comedian
Philip Davidson (1882–unknown), American gangster
 Lt. General Phillip Davidson (1915–1996), served in World War II, the Korean War, and the Vietnam War
Randall Davidson (1848–1930), 1st Baron Davidson of Lambeth, Archbishop of Canterbury
Richard Davidson (born 1951), American scientist
Richard M. Davidson, Old Testament scholar
Robert Davidson (disambiguation)
Robyn Davidson (born 1950), Australian writer
Rollo Davidson (1944–1970), mathematician
Ronald C. Davidson (1941–2016), physicist
Ross Davidson (1949–2006), British actor
Ross Davidson (footballer, born 1973), English footballer
Ross Davidson (footballer, born 1989), English footballer
Ross Davidson (footballer, born 1993), Scottish footballer

S–Z
Samuel Davidson (1807–1898), Irish Biblical scholar
Samuel Cleland Davidson (1846–1921), Irish inventor and founder of the Belfast Sirocco Works
Stewart Davidson (1886–1960), Scottish football player and coach
Stuart Davidson (cricketer) (born 1972), Scottish cricketer
Sven Davidson (1928–2008), Swedish tennis player
Thomas Davidson (palaeontologist) (1817–1885), Scottish-British palaeontologist
Thomas Davidson (philosopher) (1840–1900), Scottish philosopher
Tierna Davidson (born 1998), American soccer player
Tommy Davidson (born 1965), American actor
Thomas Randall Davidson (1747–1827), Church of Scotland minister
True Davidson (1901–1978), Canadian mayor
Tucker Davidson (born 1996), American baseball player
W. K. Davidson (1904–1974), American politician and businessman
Walter Edward Davidson (1859–1923), Colonial governor of the Seychelles, Newfoundland, New South Wales
Walter Davidson Sr. (one of the founders of the Harley-Davidson motorcycle company)
Will Davidson, UK footballer active in the 1890s
William Davidson (disambiguation), several people, including: 
William Davidson (bishop) (1919–2006), bishop of the Episcopal Diocese of Western Kansas
Bill Davidson (businessman) (1922–2009), Michigan businessman and sports team owner
William Davidson Institute, University of Michigan, named in honor of Bill Davidson
William Davidson (British Columbia politician) (fl. 1867–1907), Scottish-born miner and political figure
William Davidson (congressman) (1778–1857), member of the United States House of Representatives from North Carolina
William Davidson (conspirator) (1781–1820), African Caribbean revolutionary
William Davidson (engineer) (1844–1920), Australian civil engineer
William Davidson (filmmaker) (1928–2009), Canadian filmmaker and TV creator
William Davidson (lumberman) (1740–1790), Scottish settler in Canada
William Davidson (MCC cricketer) (1811–1894), English cricketer
William Davidson (Pennsylvania representative) (1783–1867), Pennsylvania politician
William Davidson (sailor) (1876–1939), British competition sailor
William Davidson (Sussex cricketer) (1920–2015), English cricketer
 Sir William Davidson of Curriehill (1614/15–c. 1689), Scottish merchant and member of the Privy council
William Davidson Bissett (1893–1971), Scottish recipient of the Victoria Cross
William A. Davidson, one of the founders of the Harley-Davidson motorcycle company
William B. Davidson (1888–1947), American actor
William H. Davidson (lieutenant governor) (fl. 1836–1838), Lieutenant Governor of Illinois
William H. Davidson (motorcyclist) (1905–1992), American motorcycle racer and president of Harley-Davidson Motorcycles
 Brigadier General William Lee Davidson (1746–1781), United States War of Independence, namesake of Davidson College
William Leslie Davidson (1848–1929), Scottish philosopher
William Mackay Davidson (1909–1991), Scottish haematologist and pathologist
William McCartney Davidson (1872–1942), Canadian journalist, politician, and author
William Soltau Davidson (1846–1924), New Zealander, pioneer of refrigerated shipping
William Taylor Davidson (1837–1915), owner and editor of the Fulton Democrat newspaper 
Willie G. Davidson (William Godfrey Davidson, born 1933), designer of the Harley-Davidson Super Glide
Zach Davidson (born 1998), American football player

Given name
Davidson Black (1884–1934), Canadian paleoanthropologist
Davidson (footballer) (born 1991), full name Davidson da Luz Pereira, Brazilian footballer

Fictional characters
Dr. Ben Davidson, fictional character on the ABC soap opera One Life to Live, portrayed by actor Mark Derwin
PC Andy Davidson, fictional character on the BBC science fiction series Torchwood, portrayed by actor Tom Price
Charlene "Charley" Davidson

References

See also
Davidson (disambiguation)
Viscount Davidson
Clan Davidson
Davison (disambiguation)
Davidsen (disambiguation)

English-language surnames
Scottish surnames
Surnames of Lowland Scottish origin
Patronymic surnames
Masculine given names
Surnames from given names
cs:Davidson
fr:Davidson
nl:Davidson
ja:デイヴィッドソン
pl:Davidson
pt:Davidson
ru:Давидсон
vo:Davidson